Collegiate Baseball Newspaper (also known as Collegiate Baseball Magazine and Collegiate Baseball) is an American publication based in Arizona that considers itself the "voice of amateur baseball" which has been published for over 40 years. The publication gives out several awards: Collegiate Baseball Player of the Year, Collegiate Baseball Coach of the Year, and Collegiate Baseball All-Americans.

It is published twice a month from January until June, and then once each in September and October.

The "Collegiate Baseball" newspaper poll is college sports' oldest baseball poll. A ranking of the top 30 teams is released prior to the season, weekly throughout the season, and after the conclusion of the College World Series. It started with the 1957 college baseball season.

Collegiate Baseball Player of the Year
The Collegiate Baseball Player of the Year award is given to the best player in NCAA Division I. It was first awarded in 1984.

Collegiate Baseball Coach of the Year
The Collegiate Baseball Coach of the Year award is given to the best coach in NCAA Division I. It was first awarded in 1980.

Collegiate Baseball All-Americans

The Collegiate Baseball All-Americans award is given to the best players at various positions in NCAA Division I. It was first awarded in 1981.

Collegiate Baseball Freshmen All-Americans

Louisville Slugger's Freshmen All-American Baseball Team
See footnote

Collegiate Baseball Freshman Pitcher of the Year
Beginning in 2016, the magazine began awarding honors to freshman starting pitchers and freshman relief pitchers.

2005 – Mickey Storey (RHP, Florida Atlantic)
2006 – Alex Wilson (RHP, Winthrop)
2007 – Ryan Berry (RHP, Rice)
2008 – Chris Hernandez (LHP, University of Miami)
2009 – Trevor Bauer (RHP, UCLA)
2010 – Matt Purke (LHP, Texas Christian)
2011 – Corey Knebel (RHP, Texas)
2012 – Carlos Rodon (LHP, N.C. State)
2013 – Thomas Eshelman (RHP, Cal St. Fullerton)
2014 – Zach Plesac (RHP, Ball State)
2015 – Alex Lange (RHP, LSU)
2016 – SP Colton Eastman (RHP, Cal. St. Fullerton); RP Bryce Fehmel (RHP, Oregon State)
2017 – SP Sean Mooney (RHP, St. John's); RP Kenyon Yovan (RHP, Oregon)
2018 – SP Patrick Fredrickson (RHP, Minnesota); RP Max Meyer, (RHP, Minnesota)
2019 - SP Tyler Thornton (RHP, St. Mary’s); SP J. T. Ginn (RHP, Mississippi St.)

Collegiate Baseball Freshman Player of the Year
Before 2005, there was not a specific award known as the "Freshmen Pitcher of the Year." Rather, there were multiple Players of the Year awarded each season.

1998 – Hayden Gliemmo (LHP, Auburn), Aaron Heilman (RHP Notre Dame), Xavier Nady (2B, California)
1999 – James Jurries (2B, Tulane), Mark Teixeira (3B, Georgia Tech), Blair Varnes (RHP, Florida State)
2000 – Kevin Howard (3B, Miami), Zane Carlson (RP, Baylor), Mike Fontenot (2B, Louisiana State)
2001 – Lane Mestepey (LHP, Louisiana State), Jamie D'Antona (1B, Wake Forest)
2002 – Philip Humber (RHP, Rice), Vincent Sinisi (1B, Rice), Darryl Lawhorn (1B, East Carolina)
2003 – Mark Romanczuk (LHP, Stanford), Glen Perkins (LHP, Minnesota), Jeff Clement (Southern California), Stephen Head (Mississippi)
2004 – Wade LeBlanc (LHP, Alabama), Tim Lincecum (RHP, Washington), Blair Erickson (U.C. Irvine)
2005 – Joe Savery (Rice)
2006 – Pedro Alvarez (3B, Vanderbilt)
2007 – Dustin Ackley (1B, North Carolina)
2008 – Ryan Lockwood (OF, South Florida)
2009 – Anthony Rendon (3B, Rice)
2010 – Jeremy Baltz (OF, St. John’s)
2012 – Michael Conforto (OF, Oregon State)
2013 – Alex Bregman (SS, Louisiana State)
2014 – Jake Noll (2B, Florida Gulf Coast)
2015 – Brendan McKay (Louisville), J. J. Schwarz, (Florida)
2016 – Seth Beer (Clemson), Kevin Strohschein (Tennessee Tech)
2017 – Kevin Milam (DH/RHP, Saint Mary's), Braden Shewmake (2B, Texas A&M)
2018 – Spencer Torkelson (1B, Arizona State), Ryan Ward (OF, Bryant)

See also

References

External links
Collegiate Baseball website

Sports magazines published in the United States
College baseball mass media in the United States
College baseball trophies and awards in the United States
Magazines established in 1957
Magazines published in Arizona
Baseball magazines